Aleksei Igorevich Skvortsov (born 13 January 1992) is a Russian football player who plays as a right winger or forward.

Career
Skvortsov made his debut in the Russian Second Division for FC Karelia Petrozavodsk on 17 May 2013 in a game against FC Piter Saint Petersburg.

On 4 January 2016, Skvortsov left FC Yenisey Krasnoyarsk by mutual consent.

On 10 January 2018, he signed with the Russian Premier League club FC Tosno. He made his RPL debut for Tosno on 29 April 2018 in a game against FC Rostov.

He scored the first goal as Tosno won the 2017–18 Russian Cup final against FC Avangard Kursk on 9 May 2018 in the Volgograd Arena.

Honours

Club
Tosno
 Russian Cup: 2017–18

Career statistics

References

External links
 
 
 

1992 births
Footballers from Saint Petersburg
Living people
Russian footballers
Russia youth international footballers
Association football midfielders
Russian expatriate footballers
Expatriate footballers in Armenia
FC Gandzasar Kapan players
FC Dynamo Kirov players
FC Yenisey Krasnoyarsk players
FC Volgar Astrakhan players
FC Tosno players
Russian Premier League players
FC Amkar Perm players
FC Tambov players
FC Nizhny Novgorod (2015) players
FC Khimki players
FC Orenburg players